Hemisphere refers to:
 A half of a sphere

As half of the Earth
 A hemisphere of Earth
 Northern Hemisphere
 Southern Hemisphere
 Eastern Hemisphere
 Western Hemisphere
 Land and water hemispheres
 A half of the (geocentric) celestial sphere
 Northern celestial hemisphere
 Southern celestial hemisphere
 A cultural hemisphere

As half of the brain
 A cerebral hemisphere, a division of the cerebrum
 A half of the cerebellum, a smaller part of the brain

Other 
 Hémisphère (Paradis), a 12-inch album by French artists Paradis
 Hemispheres (magazine), an inflight publication
 Hemispheres (TV series), Canadian and Australian news program
 Hemispheres (Rush album), 1978
 Hemispheres (Lily Afshar album), 2006
 Hemispheres (Doseone album), 1998
 L'Hemisfèric at the Ciutat de les Arts i les Ciències, Valencia, Spain
 Hemisphere Project, a counternarcotics program between United States federal and state drug officials and AT&T

Hemispheres